The Khabur or Little Khabur (Ava Xabûr or Xabîr, Khabir or Habur Suyu (Habur Water)) is a river that rises in Turkey and flows through Iraq to join the Tigris at the tripoint of Turkey, Iraq and Syria.

The river originates in the Uludere District in Turkey and emerges from a number of small rivers flowing off the Taurus Mountains, to the south-east of Hakkâri. From there, it generally flows south, crossing the Turkish-Iraqi border into Iraqi Kurdistan before turning west toward the Tigris. Zakho is an important town along the river, where the ancient Delal Bridge crosses the river. A few kilometres west of Zakho, the Little Khabur is joined by its main tributary the Hezil Suyu (or Nizil river or Hezil Çayı), which forms part of the border between Iraq and Turkey. From there onward the Little Khabur river forms the border for around 20 km to the Tigris and is also called (and often mistaken with) the Hezil Suyu.

See also

List of international border rivers

Border rivers
Rivers of Iraq
Rivers of Kurdistan
Rivers of Turkey
Tributaries of the Tigris River
International rivers of Asia
Iraq–Turkey border
Geography of Iraqi Kurdistan
Landforms of Şırnak Province
Zakho